John and Mary Dickson House is a historic home located at West Bloomfield in Ontario County, New York. It is an "L" shaped, heavy timer framed dwelling built about 1835 in a late Federal / early Greek Revival style.  It was built by John Dickson (1783–1852), a prominent local lawyer and member of the U.S. House of Representatives.

It was listed on the National Register of Historic Places in 2008.

References

External links

Houses on the National Register of Historic Places in New York (state)
Federal architecture in New York (state)
Greek Revival houses in New York (state)
Houses completed in 1835
Houses in Ontario County, New York
Wooden houses in the United States
National Register of Historic Places in Ontario County, New York